Robert Odongkara (born 2 September 1989) is a Ugandan international footballer who plays for Guinea club Horoya AC, as a goalkeeper.

Career
Odongkara has played club football for Villa, Uganda Revenue Authority and Saint George.

In October 2018, Odongkara moved to Adama City in the Ethiopian Premier League after seven years with Saint George. In August 2019,  Odongkara completed a move to Horoya AC on a two year contract.

International career
He made his international debut for Uganda in 2010, and has appeared in FIFA World Cup qualifying matches for them. He made one appearance at the 2017 Africa Cup of Nations, playing all ninety minutes of a 1–1 draw in the group stages with Mali.

Career statistics

International

References

External links

1989 births
Living people
Ugandan footballers
Uganda international footballers
SC Villa players
Uganda Revenue Authority SC players
Saint George S.C. players
Adama City F.C. players
Horoya AC players
Association football goalkeepers
Ugandan expatriate footballers
Ugandan expatriate sportspeople in Ethiopia
Expatriate footballers in Ethiopia
Ugandan expatriate sportspeople in Guinea
Expatriate footballers in Guinea
2017 Africa Cup of Nations players
2019 Africa Cup of Nations players
Uganda Premier League players
Ethiopian Premier League players
Guinée Championnat National players